The Akunakuna are an ethnic group of Nigeria and Cameroon, closely related to the Efik, Bahumono and Ibibio people, mostly inhabiting the area around the Cross River. Recent figures have indicated there are over three hundred fifty thousand Akunakuna people.

Name 
The Igbo word akwünaakwüna, originally referring to a town where the Akunakuna people live, was Anglicized to Akunakuna. This exonym takes no account for what the Akunakuna people actually call themselves in the Gwune language, agwaGwunɛ, though, they are related. According to the book New Dimensions in African Linguistics and Languages, During World War I, married and unmarried women were recruited to serve in the West African Frontier Force and later in the Expeditionary Force into Igboland as cooks and as soldiers' comfort. Ever since then, the word akwüna, shortened from akwünaakwüna, has referred to a prostitute. The name akunakuna can be alternatively spelled as Agwa'agune, Akuraakura, or Akura:kura.

History 
In 1846, the Umon attacked some Akunakuna canoes on the Cross River that were going to trade with the Efik, who had previously traded for European luxury goods. This was used by the Akunakuna as a Casus Belli to go to war with the Umon. Though the war lasted for years, the Akunakuna eventually lost. Under the negotiation of the Efik, the result was as follows, the Akunakuna had to pay an annual tribute to the king of Umon, in return for "keeping peace over the river". In 1888, a treaty was written with Akunakuna leaders giving the British full control to their land.

References

Ethnic groups in Cameroon
Ethnic groups in Nigeria